Those Dirty Dogs (also known as Charge!) is a 1973 Italian-Spanish Spaghetti Western film written and directed by Giuseppe Rosati and starring Gianni Garko and Stephen Boyd. The film was made in the later part of the Spaghetti Western boom. As such it features such latter-day genre elements as self-parody, guffaw humour, near-slapstick fight scenes (with accompanying sound effects), machine guns hidden in everyday household items, and bombastic villains.

Plot
In Arizona, a nasty but capable bandit, Angel Sanchez, working for a mad Mexican boss who likes being called "El Supremo", leads the boss's ragtag bandit army in stealing several hundred army rifles, along with ammunition, from a U.S. army wagon-train. They kill all the army soldiers and abduct the daughter of a prominent local doctor.

Three American soldiers, Captain Chadwell, Lieutenant Junger and Sergeant Smith, are sent by Washington to recover the weaponry, or failing that to destroy them so they cannot be used against the army. They get help from a blond adventurer, Koran, a bounty hunter who carries a pink umbrella and quotes extensively from the Moslem holy book (or so he claims it to be), whose primary interest is in capturing and turning in Angel Sanchez for the $1,000 price on his head.

Notes
The film was scored by Italian soundtrack composer Nico Fidenco. He and co-star Stephen Boyd co-wrote the song “The Wind in My Face”, which runs during the film's opening credits. Boyd also sang the song.

Cast 

 Gianni Garko as  Korano 
 Stephen Boyd as  Cpt. Chadwood Willer 
 Howard Ross as Lt. Younger 
 Simón Andreu as  Angelo Sanchez 
 Harry Baird as  Corp. Washington Smith 
 Teresa Gimpera as Miss Adams 
 Alfredo Mayo as General Mueller, El Supremo 
 Helga Liné as Maria 
 Mirella Dogan as Manola 
 Enzo Fiermonte as  Doctor 
 Gabriella Giorgelli as  Mexican Woman 
 Andrea Scotti as  Mexican Man  
 Daniele Vargas as Major 
 Lee Burton as  Corporal 
 Furio Meniconi as  Boarding House Owner
 Nazzareno Zamperla as Soldier (uncredited)

References

External links

1970s Italian-language films
English-language Italian films
English-language Spanish films
1970s English-language films
Spaghetti Western films
1973 Western (genre) films
1973 films
Films directed by Giuseppe Rosati
Films shot in Almería
Films scored by Nico Fidenco
1973 multilingual films
Italian multilingual films
Spanish multilingual films
1970s Italian films